Liga Okręgowa (group: Kraków II) or Klasa Okręgowa (group: Kraków II) is one of the groups in the Liga Okręgowa regional league in Lesser Poland Voivodeship, which represents the sixth level of the Polish football hierarchy.

The winners of the group are promoted to the IV liga Lesser Poland, while the weakest teams are relegated to Klasa A.

The introduction of Kraków II along with Kraków I groups were introduced in the 2011/12 season, with further extension to Kraków III from 2013/14 season onwards. Before that, there was one Kraków group in the Liga Okręgowa.

The tournament is organized by the Lesser Poland Football Association (Polish: Małopolski Związek Piłki Nożnej, MZPN).

Season 2020/21 
The 2020/21 season kicked off with 15 teams instead of the usual 14. Skawinka Skawina was relegated to the group from IV liga. Orlęta Rudawa and Zwierzyniecki KS Kraków were promoted from their respective Klasa A groups (Kraków II and Kraków III). Prądniczanka Kraków and Grębałowianka Kraków competed in the Kraków I in the previous season and transferred to Kraków II group for this season. TS Węgrzce and Błękitni Modlnica, that competed in this group in the season before, transferred to Kraków I. Wiślanie II Jaśkowice, that finished eleventh the 2019/20 season, did not enroll for this season's competition.

The team finishing on the top of the table will win promotion to the IV liga, while the teams finishing in the bottom three (13,14,15) will be relegated to Klasa A.

League table

Season 2019/20 
Due to the COVID-19 pandemic, the season did not restart after the winter break in March. Garbarnia II Kraków was promoted to IV liga, but none of the teams was relegated.

League table

Season 2018/19

League table

Season 2017/18

League table

Season 2016/17

League table

Season 2015/16

League table

Season 2014/15

League table

Season 2013/14

League table
Supplementary play-offs
A one match play-off was held between the last team of Kraków II Tramwaj Kraków and the last team of Kraków III Zjednoczeni Branice (Kraków). The winner of the play-offs would stay i the Liga Okręgowa, whiles the looser would get relegated to Klasa A

Season 2012/13 

Due to the extension of the Liga Okręgowa, Pozowianka Pozowice, Pogoń Skotniki (Kraków) and Tramwaj Kraków did not get relegated at the end of season.

League table

Season 2011/12

League table
Promotion play-offs

References 

Krakow
Poland
Football